The following is a list of notable events and releases of the year 1969 in Norwegian music.

Events

May
 The 17th Bergen International Festival started in Bergen, Norway.

June
 19 – The 6th Kongsberg Jazz Festival started in Kongsberg, Norway (June 27 – July 1).

July
 The 9th Moldejazz started in Molde, Norway.

Albums released

Unknown date

G
 Jan Garbarek
 Esoteric Circle (ECM Records), with Terje Rypdal, Arild Andersen and Jon Christensen

K
 Karin Krog
 Open Space (MPS Records), the Down Beat Poll Winners in Europe

V
 Jan Erik Vold
 Briskeby Blues (Philips Records), with Jan Garbarek Quartet

Deaths

 January
 24 – Pauline Hall, writer, music critic, and composer (born 1890).

 April
 11 – Ludvig Irgens-Jensen, twentieth-century composer (born 1894).

 August
 9 – Reidar Bøe, singer and composer (born 1921).

 December
 11 – Jens Gunderssen, pianist and music teacher (born 1912).
 24 – Mary Barratt Due, pianist and music teacher (born 1888).

Births

 February
 3
 Berit Cardas, violinist.
 Bjørg Lewis, cellist.
 4 – Sven Erik Kristiansen, black metal singer, guitarist, and bassist
 12 – Anneli Drecker, singer, songwriter, and actress 
 18 – Bent Sæther, bass guitarist and lead vocalist (Motorpsycho).
 22 – Ståle Storløkken, jazz keyboardist and composer.

 March
 6 – Aslag Guttormsgaard, musician, screenwriter and actor.

 April
 23 – Trude Eick, French hornist and composer.
 29 – Thomas Winther Andersen, jazz bassist and composer.

 May
 6 – Mathilde Grooss Viddal, saxophonist, clarinetist, and composer.
 12 – Erlend Skomsvoll, jazz pianist, band leader, composer, and music arranger.

 June
 21 – Håkon Gebhardt, drummer, multi-instrumentalist, and record producer (Motorpsycho).

 July
 7 – Svein Olav Herstad, jazz pianist and composer (Funky Butt).
 14 – Arvid Solvang, guitarist, songwriter, and record producer.

 August
 8 – Øyonn Groven Myhren, traditional folk musician and composer.
 18 – Susanne Lundeng, traditional folk fiddler and composer.
 25
 Olga Konkova, jazz pianist and composer.
 Øyvind Brække, jazz trombonist, composer, music arranger, and band leader (Bodega Band).

 October
 7 – Per Mathisen, jazz bassist and composer.
 8 – Gulleiv Wee, bassist (The September When). 
 9 – Lene Grenager, contemporary composer and cellist.

 November
 25 – Kim Ofstad, drummer and composer (D'Sound).
 29 – Lars Håvard Haugen, guitarist and songwriter (Hellbillies).

 December
 31 – Hans Magnus Ryan, prog-rock guitarist and vocalist (Motorpsycho).

See also
 1969 in Norway
 Music of Norway
 Norway in the Eurovision Song Contest 1969

References

 
Norwegian music
Norwegian
Music
1960s in Norwegian music